North Carolina Highway 307 (NC 307) is a primary state highway in the U.S. state of North Carolina. It serves as a spur from NC 304 into Vandemere.

Route description
NC 307 is a short  two-lane road that connects the town of Vandemere with NC 304, at Hollyville (aka Cash Corner). The highway goes through the town's residential area before ending on 1st Street near the Bay River.

History
NC 307 was established in 1930 as a renumbering part of NC 304; little has changed since.

Junction List

References

External links

 
 NCRoads.com: N.C. 307
 North Carolina Highway Begins/Ends - NC 307

Transportation in Pamlico County, North Carolina
307